Katharine Adams (25 November 1862 – 15 October 1952) was a British bookbinder famous for her detailed leather bindings.

Biography
Adams was born in Bracknell, a town in Berkshire, England, to Catherine Mary Horton (d. 1912) and Reverend William Fulford Adams (d. 1912). Her childhood friends included Jenny and May Morris, daughters of the artist William Morris. Adams trained briefly as a bookbinder with Sarah Prideaux and T. J. Cobden-Sanderson in London in 1897, then set up her own workshop in Lechlade. In May 1898, she won first prize in amateur bookbinding at the Oxford arts and crafts exhibition. 

In 1901, Adams established the Eadburgha Bindery in Gloucestershire, where she employed and trained two assistants, both women. She soon received frequent commissions from the likes of Emery Walker and Sydney Cockerell. Two of her most important commissions were The Bindings of the British Museum presented to George V and a psalter presented to Queen Mary. Her patrons also included the Doves Press, the Ashendene Press, and the Kelmscott Press. In 1913, she married Edmund James Webb, and they moved to Otmoor near Islip in Oxfordshire before returning to Gloucestershire in the 1930s.

Adams' bindings were intricate and usually featured fine, pictorial gold details on leather, made using tools she made herself (now held by the British Library). She was largely self-taught. She exhibited frequently throughout Europe as well as North America and South Africa. She became the president of the Women's Guild of Arts and, in 1938, a fellow of the Royal Society of Arts.

She continued to bind until her death at her home, The Cherries, in Gloucestershire, on 15 October 1952. In her lifetime, she completed an estimated 300 bindings.

Legacy
Adams' bindings are held by private collectors and collecting institutions alike. Her papers are held at:
 Bodleian Library (Add. MSS 45300–45304, 45307, 45330, 43694, 50002, 50004, 54231)
 J.P. Getty Library at Wormsley
 Southern Methodist University, Dallas, Bridwell Library
 University of California, Berkeley, Bancroft Library

References

Further reading
 M. Tidcombe, Women bookbinders, 1880–1920 (1996)
 J. R. Abbey, English bindings, 1490–1940, in the library of J. R. Abbey, ed. G. D. Hobson (privately printed, London, 1940)
 R. H. Lewis, Fine bookbinding in the twentieth century (1984)
 H. M. Nixon, Broxbourne library: styles and designs of bookbindings from the twelfth to the twentieth century (1956)
 H. M. Nixon, Five centuries of English bookbinding (1978)
 V. Meynell, ed., The best of friends: further letters to Sydney Carlyle Cockerell (1956) 
 S. Cockerell, The Times (20 Oct 1952) 
 S. Prideaux, Modern bookbindings: their design and decoration (1906)

1862 births
1952 deaths
Bookbinders
People from Bracknell